Magnus Antony Norman (born 19 January 1997) is an English professional footballer who plays as a goalkeeper for Oldham Athletic.

Club career

Fulham
Born in Kingston upon Thames, Norman joined Fulham at the age of 9, turning professional in October 2014. He spent loan spells at Farnborough and Hayes & Yeading United.

He joined Southport on loan in September 2016 for an initial one-month loan. In October 2016 he was described as a "key player" for the club, and in November 2016 the loan deal was extended until the end of the 2016–17 season. He returned to Fulham in March 2017, having made 29 appearances in all competitions for Southport.

He moved on loan to Rochdale in August 2018, making his debut on 21 August 2018.

Carlisle United
Norman joined Carlisle United on a free transfer on 7 August 2020, signing a two-year deal.

Oldham Athletic
On 1 July 2022, Norman joined recently relegated National League club Oldham Athletic on a one-year deal following his release from Carlisle.

International career
He has represented England at under-18 youth level.

References

1997 births
Living people
Footballers from Kingston upon Thames
English footballers
England youth international footballers
Association football goalkeepers
Fulham F.C. players
Farnborough F.C. players
Hayes & Yeading United F.C. players
Southport F.C. players
Rochdale A.F.C. players
Carlisle United F.C. players
Oldham Athletic A.F.C. players
English Football League players
Southern Football League players
National League (English football) players